The UK Wolf Conservation Trust is a non-profit organisation based in Berkshire, England. Its aims are to dispel what they regard as myths and misconceptions surrounding wolves, and to support wolves living in the wild elsewhere in Europe. It is currently home to nine wolves: Nuka, Tala, Tundra, Mai, Motomoi, Torak, Massak, Pukak and Sikko.

History
Businessman Roger Palmer visited Alaska in the 1970s where he encountered wolves for the first time. Upon his return to the UK he decided to acquire a wolf. Palmer kept wolves into the mid 1990s and, encouraged by ethologist Erich Klinghammer, founded the UK Wolf Conservation Trust (UKWCT) in 1995.

Activities
The UKWCT has 10 ambassador wolves, 9 of which are socialised wolves split into four packs. The wolves are taken for walks most weekends in the open farmland around the Trust, accompanied by members of the public and UKWCT. The idea is to allow people to see wolves in a different light to the experience seen at most zoos, which generally don't socialise their animals.

Education is a major part of the UKWCT's ethos and they hold regular seminars, with biologists and other speakers giving talks about wolves and current conservation work. The UKWCT's magazine, WolfPrint, attracts contributions from those involved with wolf conservation and reports on current events in the wolf world.

Achievements
In 1998, the UKWCT imported three European wolves from eastern Europe and in 1999 they gave birth to six pups. This was reported to be the first birth of European wolves in the UK since they were driven to extinction in the 18th century. After their relocation to Wildwood in Kent, the imported wolves had several further litters.

The UKWCT look after the UK's first Arctic wolves - Massak, Pukak and Sikko. They were imported from Quebec in Canada in March 2011 when a snowstorm destroyed their mother's den, causing her to reject the newborn cubs. The UKWCT were then invited to take these cubs back to the UK, where they have lived ever since.

Projects supported by the UKWCT include helping to buy livestock guardian dogs for Bulgarian shepherds, as well as supporting wolf research and education in the Tver region of Russia and also in Croatia. Support has also been provided for the Ethiopian wolf, for other European projects, and for the Red and Mexican wolves in the Americas. To date, the Trust has donated over £150,000 to wolf conservation projects worldwide.

References

External links

Wolf organizations
Animal conservation organizations
Animal welfare organisations based in the United Kingdom
Nature conservation organisations based in the United Kingdom
Environmental organisations based in England
Education in West Berkshire District
Organisations based in Berkshire
Environmental organizations established in 1995
1995 establishments in England
1995 establishments in the United Kingdom